Money plant may refer to several species, including: